Beyond the Bend is the third studio album by the Filipino rock the Dawn, released on June 4, 1989 by OctoArts International, Inc. in the Philippines. The lead single and the first track on the album "Salamat" became their well-known hit in the Philippines. It is Atsushi Matsuura's first album with the band. Matsuura composed the song "Puno't Dulo", while Teddy Diaz composed "Hey, Isabel" and co-wrote "Salamat" with the other members (except Matsuura).

Track listing

Personnel
Jett Pangan - vocals
JB Leonor - drums, acoustic piano, synthesizer, programming, percussion
Atsushi Matsuura - electric guitar, acoustic guitar
Teddy Diaz - guitar (track 3)
Carlos Balcells - bass guitar, percussion

Album Credits
Asst. Producer: Anton Choy Lopez
Engineered By: Lito Balagtas
Mixdown Engineer: Martin Galan/Lito Balagtas
Arranged by: The Dawn

References

1989 albums
The Dawn (band) albums
PolyEast Records albums